The 2013 PFF League (PFFL) was the 10th season of second tier of Pakistan Football Federation. The season started on 29 November 2013 and concluded on 28 December 2013. The event took place in Lahore, Layyah and Karachi.

Teams

Teams relegated from 2012–13 Pakistan Premier League 

 PMC Club Athletico Faisalabad
 Wohaib

Departmental Phase

Group stages

Group A

Group B

Group C

Group D

Group E

Club phase

Groups

Group A

Group B

Group C

2nd Departmental Phase Leg

2nd Phase Club Leg

Final

References 

Pakistan Football Federation League seasons
1
Pakistan